Amy du Plessis (born 7 July 1999) is a South African born, New Zealand rugby union player. She plays for Matatū in the Super Rugby Aupiki competition and for Canterbury provincially. She also plays for the Black Ferns internationally and was a member of their 2021 Rugby World Cup champion squad.

Early life 
Du Plessis was born in KwaZulu-Natal, South Africa. Her family immigrated and settled in Invercargill when she was seven. She was a key part of Southland Girls' High School's rugby success. She helped win their first national Top 4 final in 2016.

Rugby career

2018–20 
Du Plessis made her debut for Otago in 2018. She played for the Probables against the Possibles in the Black Ferns trial in 2020. She appeared for the Black Ferns 15s at the Takiwhitu Tuturu Pure Sevens tournament in Hataitai Park, Wellington.

Du Plessis made her Black Ferns debut off the bench on 4 November 2020 against the New Zealand Barbarians in West Auckland. She started in the second match.

2021–23 
In 2021, she was selected for the Matatū squad for the inaugural season of Super Rugby Aupiki in 2022.

Du Plessis was named in the Black Ferns squad for the 2022 Pacific Four Series. She made her international debut for the Black Ferns on 12 June 2022 against Canada in West Auckland. She was reselected in the squad for the August test series against Australia for the Laurie O'Reilly Cup.

Du Plessis was selected for the Black Ferns 2021 Rugby World Cup 32-player squad. New Zealand won their sixth World title after narrowly beating England 34–31 in the final.

Du Plessis returned for her second season with Matatū for the 2023 Super Rugby Aupiki competition.

References

External links 

 Black Ferns Profile

1999 births
Living people
New Zealand female rugby union players
New Zealand women's international rugby union players